Otechestvennyua Zapiski (variously translated as "Annals of the Fatherland", "Patriotic Notes", "Notes of the Fatherland", etc.) was a Russian literary magazine published in Saint Petersburg on a monthly basis between 1818 and 1884. The journal served liberal-minded readers known as the intelligentsia. Such major novels as Ivan Goncharov's Oblomov (1859), Fyodor Dostoyevsky's The Double (1846) and The Adolescent (1875) and Mikhail Saltykov-Shchedrin's The Golovlyov Family (1880) made their first appearance in Otechestvennye Zapiski.

Founded by Pavel Svinyin in 1818, the journal was published irregularly until 1820. It was closed down in 1830 but resurfaced several years later, with Andrey Krayevsky as its publisher. The renovated magazine regularly published articles by Vissarion Belinsky and Alexander Herzen, catering to well-educated liberals. Other notable contributors included:

 Mikhail Bakunin
 Timofey Granovsky
 Nikolay Nekrasov
 Ivan Turgenev
 Vladimir Dahl
 Vladimir Odoyevsky
 Aleksey Pisemsky
 Afanasy Fet

In 1846 Nekrasov persuaded Belinsky and other contributors to leave Otechestvennye Zapiski for his own Sovremennik. As a result, the former declined in circulation and influence. It was overshadowed by the more radical Sovremennik for 20 years, until the latter was banned in 1866.

In 1868 Nekrasov acquired Otechestvennye Zapiski from Krayevsky and started editing it jointly with Saltykov-Shchedrin. After Nekrasov's death Saltykov-Schedrin was its sole editor-in-chief, radicalizing the journal even further. In the 1870s it was transformed into a mouthpiece of the Narodnik movement.

Despite Saltykov's mastery of "Aesopian" language, the tsarist authorities closed Otechestvennye zapiski in 1884 as "an organ of the press which not only opens its pages to the spread of dangerous ideas, but even has as its closest collaborators people who belong to secret societies".

Featured titles
Fyodor Dostoyevsky
The Double (1846)
White Nights (1848)
Netochka Nezvanova (1849)
The Village of Stepanchikovo (1859)
The Adolescent (1875)
Ivan Goncharov
Frigate "Pallada" (1858)
Oblomov (1859)
Nikolai Leskov
Musk-ox (1863)
The Amazon (1866)
Nikolai Nekrasov
Russian Women (1872-1873)
Who Is Happy in Russia? (1863-1876)
Leo Tolstoy
A Morning of a Landed Proprietor (1852)
Mikhail Saltykov-Shchedrin
The History of a Town (1870)
The Golovlyov Family (1880)
Modern Idyll (1883)
Fables (1869—1886)

References

External links
 Online version

1818 establishments in the Russian Empire
Defunct literary magazines published in Europe
Defunct magazines published in Russia
Magazines established in 1818
Magazines disestablished in 1884
Magazines published in Saint Petersburg
Literary magazines published in Russia
Russian-language magazines
Monthly magazines published in Russia
Irregularly published magazines